Qishuyan railway station is a railway station on the Beijing–Shanghai railway and Shanghai–Nanjing intercity railway. The station is located in Wujin District, Changzhou, Jiangsu, China.

History
The station opened in 1907.

References

External links
 

Railway stations in China opened in 1907
1907 establishments in China
Stations on the Shanghai–Nanjing Intercity Railway
Stations on the Beijing–Shanghai Railway
Railway stations in Changzhou
Wujin District